The Students of Springfield Street is a 2015 British film written and directed by Steve Johnson. The film marks Johnson's debut as a director and was Shot on RED in Glasgow, Scotland. The film was crowd funded on Bloomvc raising $6,000 to fund the production in just four weeks.

Plot
The Students of Springfield Street follows twenty-four hours in the lives of six friends, examining the intricate weave of words, actions and emotions that unknowingly link and change the direction of their lives and how difficult it can be when debt, sickness, lies, drugs, pregnancy, unrequited love and assault weave their way into their ordinary lives.

Cast
 Chris Donald as Michael
 Amanda Marment as Sarah
 Andreas Munoz as Christiano
 Millie Turner as Jessica
 Alix Austin as Ashley
 Martin Bell as Daniel
 Tanya Van Amse as Bloom

Release and reception
The film was released on 26 June 2015 and had its world premiere at the HoosierDance International Film Festival in the United States. Speaking in the Kokomo Tribune about the film, Martin Slagter wrote: 

Film review website Indyred wrote: 

On 23 October 2015, the film had its UK premiere when it opened the Aberdeen Film Festival. The film proved to be a hit with the festival's jurors who awarded the film the Best Feature accolade. Speaking about his win to Creative Clyde, Johnson said:

Awards and nominations

References

External links
 
 The Students of Springfield Street Official Website
 Futuristfilm Website

2015 films
Scottish films
British independent films
Films set in Scotland
Films shot in Scotland
2015 directorial debut films
2010s English-language films
2010s British films